Lixia District is one of 10 urban districts of the prefecture-level city and the capital of Jinan, the capital of Shandong Province, East China (one of the sister cities of Sacramento, the capital of California), forming part of the city's urban core. It borders the districts of Licheng to the north and east, Shizhong to the southwest, and Tianqiao to the northwest.

Administrative divisions
As 2012, this district is divided to 13 subdistricts.
Subdistricts

References

External links
 Official home page

Lixia
Jinan